Deja Young (born June 10, 1996) is an American Paralympic athlete from Dallas, Texas. She participates in the T46 sprinting events.

Biography
Deja Young is the youngest daughter of Don and Delora Young, and she has an older sister named Dyani. She was born with brachial plexus, or shoulder dystocia, which has caused nerve damage and limited mobility in her right shoulder. This was caused during childbirth by a panicked doctor who pulled on her head too hard, causing her right shoulder to dislocate.  She had to undergo three surgeries to reduce her discomfort.

Sporting career
Young was a standout volleyball and softball player in high school.  However, her disability hindered her performance, and she decided to do track and field athletics.  When she took part in track events as a freshman, she discovered speed, and has been interested from then on.  Young has been an athlete in two Missouri Valley Conference championship teams in 60m and 100m events, and was also a relay team participant in Wichita State's 400m relay as a freshman and junior.

Young participated in her first international athletics event in 2015 in Doha, Qatar.  She won her first gold medal in the 100 meters by five-tenths of a second, defeating silver medalist Wang Yanping and bronze medalist Alicja Fiodorow. In the 200m final, Young won a silver medal after being beaten by Cuban athlete Yunidis Castillo by half a second.

References

External links 
 
 

1996 births
Living people
Paralympic track and field athletes of the United States
People from Mesquite, Texas
Sportspeople from the Dallas–Fort Worth metroplex
Track and field athletes from Texas
Wichita State Shockers women's track and field athletes
World Para Athletics Championships winners
Paralympic medalists in athletics (track and field)
Medalists at the 2019 Parapan American Games
Paralympic gold medalists for the United States
Paralympic bronze medalists for the United States
Athletes (track and field) at the 2016 Summer Paralympics
Athletes (track and field) at the 2020 Summer Paralympics
Medalists at the 2016 Summer Paralympics
Medalists at the 2020 Summer Paralympics